Kane Palma-Newport (born 26 October 1990) is an English rugby union player, who plays as a prop for French side US Colomiers in Pro D2.

A product of the Bath Rugby academy, Palma-Newport made his Aviva Premiership debut as a substitute against Newcastle in the 2010-11 season.

He spent a brief period on loan at Leeds Carnegie during the 2011-12 season, scoring two tries in six appearances. His loan came to an end when he was recalled by Bath.

References 

1990 births
Living people
British rugby union players
English people of Italian descent
English rugby union players
Rugby union players from Bath, Somerset
US Colomiers players
Rugby union props